Senator Pedro Sabido (born October 19, 1894, Polangui, Albay, Philippines – February 3, 1980) was born to Don Juan D. Sabido and Doña Maximina Ribaya.

Early life and education
He attended his elementary and high school studies at the Seminario Colegio de Nueva Caceres. He graduated from the Seminary College of Naga with the degree of Bachelor of Laws and Philosophy degree in 1916 and was made honorary member of Real Academia Española, Spain in 1927.

Work in Philippine legislature
Senator Sabido was elected Representative from the third district of Albay to the Philippine Legislature (National Assembly) continuously in 1922 for a period of 16 years. He was also Chairman of the important Committees on Public Works, on Revision of Laws and on Mines. During his term in the Philippine Legislature, Senator Sabido was prevailed upon by the late President Quezon to serve in the Executive Department of the Government as Chairman and General Manager of the National Abaca and other Fibers Corporation (NAFCO) and later on as Executive Affairs in the Cabinet of the late President Jose P. Laurel, Sr.

Ambassadorship
In 1953 President Ramon Magsaysay appointed Senator Sabido as Ambassador to Spain and the Vatican. He had to relinquish his diplomatic post in 1955 when he was drafted by the Nacionalista Party to become one of its candidates for Senator and won said election. As a Senator, he is the chairman of the Committee on Banks, Corporations and Franchise, Committee on Health of the Senate, a member of the Commission on Appointments. His brilliant work in the Senate has merited the recognition of the press and noted one of the Outstanding Senators of the Year consistently for five years from 1956 to 1961.

Personal life
He was married to Gloria Madrid, with whom he had a son and a daughter.

References

1894 births
1980 deaths
People from Albay
Members of the House of Representatives of the Philippines from Albay
Senators of the 4th Congress of the Philippines
Senators of the 3rd Congress of the Philippines
Ambassadors of the Philippines to Spain
Laurel administration cabinet members
Majority leaders of the House of Representatives of the Philippines
Members of the Philippine Legislature
Members of the Batasang Pambansa